Saber Interactive Inc. is an American video game developer and publisher founded in 2001 with headquarters in Fort Lauderdale, Florida. Saber was acquired by Embracer Group in February 2020, making the studio a direct subsidiary. The company employs over 1,350 people.

History 
Saber Interactive was founded in 2001 by Andrey Iones, Matthew Karch, and Anton Krupkin. Together they created a 3D engine from scratch, gathered a team of artists from Saint Petersburg, Russia and began working on their first game, Will Rock. After the release of Will Rock, Saber developed their proprietary game engine, Saber3D, which was used in their second title, TimeShift (2007). The Saber3D engine has since been continuously updated and evolved for use in current games.

In 2010, Saber was approached by Microsoft's 343 Industries to remake Halo: Combat Evolved for the game's tenth anniversary. This would be Saber's first involvement in a major franchise and COO Andrey Iones considered it "an opportunity that we couldn’t miss". To maintain the original game experience, Saber used the original engine for game play and the Saber3D engine for visuals. Halo Combat Evolved Anniversary was released on November 15, 2011 to positive reviews. Saber then assisted in 2014 on the development of Halo: The Master Chief Collection.

On August 1, 2016, Saber Interactive opened its first internal studio outside of Russia in Madrid. This was the beginning of a major international expansion, with Saber opening studios in Sundsvall, Sweden (by buying porting studio Binary Motion), and Minsk, Belarus.

CDProjekt RED partnered with Saber in 2018 on the Nintendo Switch port of The Witcher 3: Wild Hunt — Complete Edition. The port was released on October 15, 2019 to positive reviews highlighting the performance and playability.

On April 16, 2019, Saber launched World War Z. The game sold over one million units in its first week of release.

id Software studio director Tim Willits joined Saber as chief creative officer on August 1, 2019.

In October 2019, Saber Interactive acquired Bigmoon Entertainment, a game development studio of forty people based in Porto, Portugal, and rebranded the studio as Saber Porto.

Saber was acquired by Embracer Group in February 2020 in a deal worth US$525 million. Under the deal, Saber became the fifth direct subsidiary under Embracer and maintains autonomy. Post-acquisition, Matthew Karch continues to serve as chief executive officer and Andrey Iones as chief operating officer. After joining Embracer, Saber became a platform for future acquisitions of other studios.

In August 2020, Saber Interactive acquired 4A Games, the developers behind the Metro video game series and New World Interactive, the developers of Insurgency: Sandstorm. In November 2020, Saber Interactive acquired 34BigThings, Mad Head Games, Nimble Giant Entertainment, Snapshot Games and Zen Studios. Former President and CEO of id Software, Todd Hollenshead, joined Saber as Head of Publishing on November 18, 2020.

Saber and Boss Team Games announced Evil Dead: The Game during The Game Awards 2020.

In February 2021, Embracer Group announced that they acquired Aspyr and that the developer would be a subsidiary for Saber Interactive. The day one purchase price amounts to US$100 million on a cash and debt free basis, where US$60 million is paid in cash and US$40 million is paid in newly issued Embracer B shares. An additional consideration of a maximum of US$350 million may be paid under the agreement subject to certain conditions.

In June 2021, new publishing label Prime Matter announced Saber Interactive was developing a new entry in the Painkiller franchise.

On June 10, 2021, Warhorse Studios announced that Saber Interactive will be developing a Kingdom Come: Deliverance port for the Nintendo Switch.

In August 2021, Saber Interactive acquired 3D Realms, Slipgate Ironworks, SmartPhone Labs, Demiurge Studios, and Fractured Byte.

In September 2021, Saber Interactive acquired Bytex.

In December 2021, Saber Interactive acquired DIGIC Pictures and Shiver Entertainment.

Games

Subsidiaries

Notes

References

External links 
 

 
American companies established in 2001
Embracer Group
Video game companies established in 2001
Video game companies of the United States
Video game development companies
2020 mergers and acquisitions
Companies based in Fort Lauderdale, Florida
2001 establishments in New Jersey
American subsidiaries of foreign companies